Çobansığnaq (also, Chobansygnakh) is a village and municipality in the Tovuz Rayon of Azerbaijan.  It has a population of 1,589.  The municipality consists of the villages of Çobansığnaq, Qaraboyunlar, Namxoş, and Yoğunbulaq.

References 

Populated places in Tovuz District